Meldrum's acid or 2,2-dimethyl-1,3-dioxane-4,6-dione is an organic compound with formula .

It is a crystalline colorless solid, sparingly soluble in water. It decomposes on heating with release of carbon dioxide and acetone.

Properties

Acidity
The compound can easily lose a hydrogen ion from the methylene element  in the ring (carbon 5); which creates a double bond between it and one of the adjacent carbons (number 4 or 6), and a negative charge in the corresponding oxygen.  The resulting anion  is stabilized by resonance between the two alternatives, so that the double bond is delocalized and each oxygen in the carbonyls has a formal charge of −1/2.

The ionization constant pKa is 4.97; which makes it behave as a monobasic acid even though it contains no carboxylic acid groups.  In this and other properties, the compound resembles dimedone and barbituric acid.  However, while dimedone exists in solution predominantly as the mono-enol tautomer, Meldrum's acid is almost entirely as the diketone form.

The unusually high acidity of this compound was long considered anomalous—it is 8 orders of magnitude more acidic than the closely related compound dimethyl malonate.  In 2004, Ohwada and coworkers determined that the energy-minimizing conformation structure of the compound places the alpha proton's σCH orbital in the proper geometry to align with the π*CO, so that the ground state poses unusually strong destabilization of the C-H bond.

Preparation

Original synthesis
The compound was first made by Meldrum by a condensation reaction of acetone with malonic acid in acetic anhydride and sulfuric acid.

Alternative syntheses
As an alternative to its original preparation, Meldrum's acid can be synthesized from malonic acid, isopropenyl acetate (an enol derivative of acetone), and catalytic sulfuric acid.

A third route is the reaction of carbon suboxide  with acetone in the presence of oxalic acid.

Uses
Like malonic acid and its ester derivatives, and other 1,3-dicarbonyl compounds, Meldrum's acid can and serve as a reactant for a variety of nucleophilic reactions.

Alkylation and acylation 
The acidity of carbon 5 (between the two carbonyl groups) allows simple derivatization of Meldrum's acid at this position, through reactions such as alkylation and acylation. For example, deprotonation and reaction with a simple alkyl halide attaches the alkyl group at that position:

The analogous reaction with an acyl chloride attaches the acyl instead:

These two reactions allow Meldrum's acid to serve as a starting scaffold for the synthesis of many different structures with various functional groups. The alkylated products can be further manipulated to produce various amide and ester compounds. Heating the acyl product in the presence of an alcohol leads to ester exchange and decarboxylation in a process similar to the malonic ester synthesis. The reactive nature of the cyclic-diester allows good reactivity even for alcohols as hindered as t-butanol, and this reactivity of Meldrum's acid and it's derivatives has been used to develop a range of reactions. Ketoesters formed from the reaction of alcohols with Meldrum's acid derivatives are useful in the Knorr pyrrole synthesis.

Synthesis of ketenes 
At temperatures greater than 200 °C  Meldrum's acid undergoes a pericyclic reaction that releases acetone and carbon dioxide and produces a highly reactive ketene compound:

These ketenes can be isolated using flash vacuum pyrolysis (FVP). Ketenes are highly electrophilic and can undergo addition reaction with a range of other chemicals, particularly ketene cycloadditions, or dimerisation to diketene. With this approach it is possible to form new C–C bonds, rings, amides, esters, and acids:

          

          

Alternately, the pyrolysis can be performed in solution, to obtain the same results without isolating the ketene, in a one-pot reaction.  The ability to form such diverse products makes Meldrum's acid a very useful reagent for synthetic chemists.

History

The compound is named after Andrew Norman Meldrum who reported its synthesis in 1908. He misidentified its structure as a β-lactone of β-hydroxyisopropylmalonic acid; the correct structure, the bislactone of 1,3-dioxane was reported in 1948.

References

Further reading
  
 
 

Organic acids
Lactones
Dioxanes